Halley Feiffer (born November 20, 1984) is an American actress and playwright.

Early life and education
Feiffer was raised in a Jewish family, the daughter of famed satirist and cartoonist Jules Feiffer, and writer, actor, and comedian Jenny Allen. Feiffer graduated from Wesleyan University in 2007.

Career

Theater 
Feiffer's work as a playwright has been produced off-Broadway at the Atlantic Theater Company, the Rattlestick Playwrights Theater, MCC Theater and the Cherry Lane Theatre, and regionally at Williamstown Theatre Festival and elsewhere.

Her play How to Make Friends and Then Kill Them premiered at the Rattlestick Playwrights Theater in October 2014, directed by Kip Fagan.

Her play I'm Gonna Pray For You So Hard, directed by Trip Cullman and starring Betty Gilpin and Reed Birney, broke box office records for the Atlantic Theater Company's Stage 2 space, was a Time Out New York Critics Pick, and was nominated for an Outer Critics Circle Award (the John Gassner Playwriting Award) in 2015. It had its UK premiere in March 2017 at the Finborough Theatre, London.

Her play A Funny Thing Happened on the Way to the Gynecologic Oncology Unit at Memorial Sloan Kettering Cancer Center of New York City, directed by Trip Cullman, won the Edgerton New Play Award before it premiered at MCC Theater in Spring 2016. The play starred Beth Behrs and Lisa Emery and was a New York Times Critic's Pick. It had its UK premiere in October 2018 at the Finborough Theatre, London. The Geffen Playhouse presented the West Coast premiere of the play in the fall as a part of their 2017–18 season in Los Angeles, which Feiffer also starred in.

Feiffer's world premiere of her new play, Moscow Moscow Moscow Moscow Moscow Moscow,  a contemporary adaptation of Anton Chekhov’s Three Sisters, was part of the Williamstown Theatre Festival 2017 season. The production was directed by Trip Cullman, and starred Rebecca Henderson, Tavi Gevinson, Ryan Spahn, and Tony Award nominees Cristin Milioti, Thomas Sadoski and Micah Stock. The play received its New York premiere at MCC Theater in June 2019, and was nominated for a 2020 Drama Desk Award for Outstanding Adaptation and for a 2020 Drama League Award for Outstanding Production of a Play.

In March 2019, Playwrights Horizons premiered Feiffer's other new play The Pain of My Belligerence directed by Trip Cullman and featuring Feiffer in the lead role opposite Hamish Linklater, for which she was nominated for a 2020 Drama League Award for Distinguished Performance.

Feiffer won the National Young Playwrights' Contest in 2002 and the Lotos Foundation Award for Playwriting in 2015. Three of her plays have landed on The Kilroys' List

Her plays have been produced, commissioned and developed by Manhattan Theater Club, Second Stage Theatre, New York Theatre Workshop, LAByrinth Theater Company, The Eugene O'Neill Theater Center, Cape Cod Theatre Project and elsewhere, and have been commissioned by Manhattan Theater Club, Williamstown Theatre Festival, the Alfred P. Sloan Foundation, Atlantic Theater Company and Playwrights Horizons. Her work is published by Dramatists Play Service, Overlook Press, Vintage Books, Applause Books, Samuel French and Smith & Kraus.

She has performed off-Broadway in subUrbia, Election Day, None of the Above, Still Life, Some Americans Abroad, Tigers Be Still (for which she was nominated for a Drama League Award), Kenneth Lonergan's Medieval Play and Ethan Coen's Women or Nothing.

In April 2011, she made her Broadway debut in The House of Blue Leaves starring Ben Stiller, Edie Falco and Jennifer Jason Leigh, directed by David Cromer, for which she won a Theatre World Award. In Fall 2016, Feiffer starred in the Broadway revival of The Front Page starring Nathan Lane, John Slattery, John Goodman, Holland Taylor, Jefferson Mays, Sherie Rene Scott, and Robert Morse.

She is writing the book for the Broadway-bound musical adaptation of "Thelma and Louise" with music and lyrics by Neko Case, directed by Trip Cullman.

Television and film 
As an actress, Feiffer's film credits include Kenneth Lonergan's You Can Count on Me, Stephanie Daley, Noah Baumbach's The Squid and the Whale and Margot at the Wedding, Oren Moverman's The Messenger, Jared Hess's Gentlemen Broncos, Jeff Lipsky's Twelve Thirty, Todd Haynes' HBO miniseries Mildred Pierce, Desiree Akhavan's Appropriate Behavior, and Sasha Gordon's It Had to Be You alongside Cristin Milioti.

She also guest-starred on the HBO show Flight of the Conchords in the Season Two episode "Wingmen", and has guest-starred on Ugly Betty, The Good Wife, Law & Order, Torchwood and Royal Pains. She had a recurring role in the third and final season of Jonathan Ames' cult HBO series Bored to Death as Ted Danson's character's recovering alcoholic daughter Emily.

Additionally, Feiffer starred in the 2013 film He's Way More Famous Than You, directed by Michael Urie, which she co-wrote with Ryan Spahn and executive produced. She also co-created and stars in the 2015 Stage17.tv web series What's Your Emergency?, the first season of which was directed by Urie.

In 2014, Feiffer became a writer for the Starz series The One Percent, co-created by Academy Award-winner Alejandro González Iñárritu, which was scheduled to begin filming in 2016 but was put into turnaround the following year.

Feiffer was a writer/producer for the Amazon Studios series Mozart in the Jungle. She was also a producer on the comedy series Kidding starring Jim Carrey for Showtime, a Supervising Producer on FX's Impeachment: American Crime Story for which she was nominated for a WGA Award, a Consulting Producer on the upcoming Amazon series Rodeo Queens (produced by and starring Dakota Johnson), a Consulting Producer on the upcoming Apple TV+ series Roar (created by Carly Mensch and Liz Flahive), a co-executive producer on the upcoming Apple TV+ series Dear Edward (created by Jason Katims), and a co-executive producer on the upcoming Amazon series Daddy. She is developing a limited series with Ryan Murphy Productions for Netflix, an adaptation of the upcoming book Bad Summer People for Prime Video and an adaptation of Jean Hanff Korelitz’s book The Latecomer for Fifth Season.

Filmography

Film

Television

References

External links
 

American stage actresses
American film actresses
Living people
Wesleyan University alumni
1984 births
American women dramatists and playwrights
21st-century American actresses
American television actresses
Jewish American actresses
Jewish American writers
Theatre World Award winners
21st-century American Jews
21st-century American dramatists and playwrights
21st-century American women writers
21st-century American screenwriters
American women television writers
American television writers